Luis Mena may refer to:

 Luis de Mena, 18th-century Mexican painter
 Luis Mena (Nicaraguan politician) (Luis Mena Vado, c. 1865–1928), Nicaraguan politician
 Luís Mena e Silva (1902–1963), Portuguese sport equestrian rider
 Luis Rojas Mena (1917–2009), Mexican Roman Catholic bishop
 Luis Mena Arroyo (1920–2009), Mexican Roman Catholic bishop
 Luis Felipe Bravo Mena (born 1952), Mexican politician
 Luis Mena (Chilean footballer) (Luis Mena Irarrázabal, born 1979), Chilean footballer
 Luis Enrique Mena (born 1992), Colombian footballer
 Luis Acosta (footballer) (Luis Acosta Mena, born 1994), Spanish footballer

See also

 Mena (disambiguation)
 Luis (disambiguation)
 Mena (surname)
 José Luís Mena Barreto (1817–1879), Brazilian politician and military officer